This is a list of fellows of the Royal Society elected in 1723.

Fellows
 Nicolo Alberbo d'Aragona (fl. 1723)
 John Armstrong (1674–1742)
 Gilbert Burnett (1690–1726)
 Simon Degge (c. 1694–1729)
 Antoine Deidier (?1696–1746)
 Anthony Le Duc (fl. 1723)
 Sir John Evelyn, 1st Baronet of Wotton (1682–1763)
 West Fenton (c. 1699–1731)
 Domenico Ferrari (d. 1744)
 Philips Glover (1697–1745)
 Hewer Edgley Hewer (c. 1692–1728)
 Benjamin Holloway (c. 1691–1759)
 Henry Jones (d. 1727)
 Robert Marsham, 1st Baron Romney (1685–1724)
 Alexander Monro (1697–1767)
 Ralph Ord (d. 1724)
 Isaac de Sequeira Samuda (d. ?1743)
 James Thornhill (1675–1734)
 Giulio Carlo de' Toschi di Fagnano (1682–1766)
 John Ward (c. 1679–1758)
 John White (1699–1769)
 Francis Wollaston (1694–1774)

References

1723
1723 in science
1723 in England